Bending All the Rules is a 2002 American romance film written and directed by Morgan Klein and Peter Knight, and starring Bradley Cooper.

Plot 

An ambitious woman with an odd upbringing struggles to find herself amidst juggling two guys she's dating. Even though both guys know about each other and are complete opposites, jealousy begins to boil over as convivial antics break out between the two. Tough decisions will be made when growing up the hard way.

Cast
 Bradley Cooper as Jeff
 Colleen Porch as Kenna
 David Gail as Martin
 Morgan Klein as DJ Sweaty
 Shauna Vatovec as Young Kenna 
 Ashlee Payne as Lauri
 Jennifer Shumaker as Aunt Charlee
 Alana De La Garza as the Woman ordering shots 
 J.C. Loader as Gina
 Sam Beam cameo
 Wade Boggs cameo

Production 
It was filmed in Florida.

References

External links
 
 
 Official Trailer: https://www.youtube.com/watch?v=eKgKyhyNcm4
 https://web.archive.org/web/20150418061059/http://www.celebuzz.com/2011-06-14/bradley-cooper-stripped-down-to-nothing-in-bending-all-the-rules-movie-video/

2002 films
2002 romantic drama films
American romantic drama films
Films shot in Florida
2000s English-language films
2000s American films